Tumin is a village in northwestern Syria. It may also refer to:

Tumin an alternative currency in the Mexican municipality of El Espinal, Veracruz.

People
Abul Kamal Tumin, military leader who conquered Fes in 1032.
Melvin Tumin (1919 – 1994), American sociologist

See also
Nesta Toumine (1912 – 1996), Canadian dancer, choreographer, artistic director and teacher
Stephen Tumim, British judge
Aloizs Tumiņš (1938 – 2009), Latvian boxer from the Soviet Union
Tumins, alternate name for Tamins